Harry Conroy (6 April 1943 – 24 April 2010) was a trade union leader and journalist. He was the General Secretary of the National Union of Journalists from 1985 to 1990.

Born in Glasgow, he attended Lourdes Secondary School in Cardonald. He worked as a trainee lab technician in the Southern General Hospital before finding work at the  Scottish Daily Express. He subsequently worked for various newspapers including the Daily Record, before becoming chair of the NUJ. In 2006, he wrote a biography of Prime Minister James Callaghan, based on his experiences as press officer for the Labour Party during Callaghan's tenure as leader. Conroy also edited a biography by writer Brian McGeachan called The Cardinal, in 2001 and collaborated with McGeachan on a 2003 book, They Rose Again.

References

1943 births
2010 deaths
General Secretaries of the National Union of Journalists
Scottish journalists
Trade unionists from Glasgow
People educated at Lourdes Secondary School
Presidents of the National Union of Journalists